The following is a list of islands of Wyoming.  Occupying 97,814 square miles (253,348 km²), the state of Wyoming is the 10th largest state in the country.  It is the sixth largest state to not have an ocean coastline.  Despite being landlocked, Wyoming does contain islands; the state contains 713.16 square miles (1,847 km²) of water, which is 0.72% of the state's total area.

Wyoming has 35 named islands, in which the majority of those are located in Jackson Lake (Grand Teton National Park) and Yellowstone Lake (Yellowstone National Park) in the northwest portion of the state.  The Green River and several other rivers contain numerous river islands.

References

External links
 Wyoming Place Names

Wyoming
Islands